Stillo is a surname. Notable people with the surname include:

Luigi Stillo (born 1984), Italian footballer
Roberto Stillo (born 1991), Canadian soccer player

See also
Jenny Palacios-Stillo (born 1960), Honduran cross-country skier
Stello
Stillo Island, an island of Albania